Annandale Water services is a motorway service station in the village of Johnstonebridge, Scotland. The service station is located next to the A74(M) motorway and is accessed using motorway junction 16 in both the northbound and southbound directions.  It is owned by Roadchef.  The current site was opened in Easter 1995.

External links 
Annandale Water - Motorway Services Online
Roadchef

Motorway service areas in Scotland
RoadChef motorway service stations
Transport in Dumfries and Galloway